Tap dance is a form of dance characterized by using the sounds of tap shoes striking the floor as a form of percussion. Two major variations on tap dance exist: rhythm (jazz) tap and Broadway tap. Broadway tap focuses on dance; it is widely performed in musical theater. Rhythm tap focuses on musicality, and practitioners consider themselves to be a part of the jazz tradition.

The sound is made by shoes that have a metal "tap" on the heel and toe. There are different brands of shoes which sometimes differ in the way they sound.

History 

Tap dance is an indigenous American dance form with roots that go back 300 years to British and West African musical and step dance traditions. These fused and evolved into a form of dance called "jigging", which was taken up by minstrel show dancers in the 1800s. Tap dance then became a popular stage entertainment.

As minstrel shows began to decline in popularity, tap dance moved to the increasingly popular Vaudeville stage. Due to Vaudeville's unspoken "two-colored rule", which forbade blacks to perform solo, many Vaudeville tap acts were duets. One such duo was "Buck and Bubbles," which consisted of John "Bubbles" Sublett tap dancing and Ford "Buck" Washington playing a piano. The duo performed a "Class Act", a routine in which the performers wore tuxedos, effectively distinguishing them from the older minstrel show concept of tap dancers as "grinning-and-dancing clowns."

Another notable figure during this period is Bill "Bojangles" Robinson, a protégé of Alice Whitman of The Whitman Sisters around 1904 (then known as "Willie Robinson"). Well versed in both Buck and Wing dancing and Irish Step dancing, Robinson joined the Vaudeville circuit in 1902 in a duo with George W. Cooper. The act quickly became famous, headlining events across the country, and touring England as well. In 1908, the partnership ended and Robinson began dancing solo, which was extremely rare for a black man at that time. Despite this, he had tremendous success and soon became a world-famous celebrity. He went on to have a leading role in many films, notably in the Shirley Temple franchise.

Shortly thereafter, the Nicholas Brothers came on the scene. Consisting of real life brothers Fayard and Harold, this team wowed audiences with their acrobatic feats incorporated into their classy style of dancing. A notable scene in the movie "Stormy Weather" features the pair dancing up a staircase and then descending the staircase in a series of leapfrogs over each other into a full split from which they rise with no hands.

During the 1930s tap dance mixed with Lindy Hop. "Flying swing outs" and "flying circles" are Lindy Hop moves with tap footwork. In the mid- to late 1950s, the style of entertainment changed. Jazz music and tap dance declined, while rock and roll and the new jazz dance emerged. What is now called jazz dance evolved out of tap dance, so both dances have many moves in common. But jazz evolved separately from tap dance to become a new form in its own right. Well-known dancers during the 1960s and 1970s included Arthur Duncan and Tommy Tune.

No Maps on My Taps, the Emmy award winning PBS documentary of 1979, helped begin the recent revival of tap dance. The outstanding success of the animated film, Happy Feet, has further reinforced the popular appeal. National Tap Dance Day in the United States, now celebrated May 25, was signed into law by President George Bush on November 7, 1989. (May 25 was chosen because it is the birthday of famous tapper Bill "Bojangles" Robinson.) Prominent modern tap dancers have included Sarah Reich, Brenda Bufalino, Melinda Sullivan, The Clark Brothers, Savion Glover, Gregory and Maurice Hines, LaVaughn Robinson, Jason Samuels Smith, Chloe Arnold, Michelle Dorrance, Dormeshia Sumbry-Edwards, and Dianne "Lady Di" Walker. Indie-pop band Tilly and the Wall also features a tap dancer, Jamie Pressnall, tapping as percussion.

Segregation's impact 

During the 1930s and the 1940s, Americans were able to watch tap dancers perform on film. However, Black tap dancers found it extremely difficult to be a part of these White films because segregation was extremely prominent in America. This led to the creation of two different styles of tap dance: White tap dancers formed a Broadway style and Black dancers continued to evolve with the traditional rhythm based style. Broadway tap dance was performed in mainly Broadway musicals and film, and it did not emphasize classic jazz rhythms. Rhythm tap integrated more of the classic African roots of tap dance, and it emphasized jazz rhythms, musicality, and improvisation.  Musicality is the dancer's understanding of the music they are performing to. Improvisation is where a dancer makes up the movement as they perform, and the choreography is not prepared beforehand.

There was also the "two-color rule," which made sure that Black tap dancers were not able to perform solos onstage. This led to some tap dancers performing comedic tap duets. There were stereotypes placed on Black Americans such as the "Uncle Tom" stereotype, and many tap dancers were forced to wear "black-face" onstage in order to perform. One of the first Black tap dancers to be acknowledged by America was Bill "Bojangles" Robinson, who performed duets with Shirley Temple. However, Bill Robinson's career was reduced to "minstrelsy," which can be defined as White performers using makeup to mock Black culture or using Black stereotypes in a performance. Black Americans joined these minstrel performances where they would be forced to act on Black stereotypes in their performances. Overall, White Americans never denied African American culture, but they would showcase African American culture to White audiences unethically.

Characteristics 

Tap dancers make frequent use of syncopation. Choreography typically starts on the eighth or first beat count. Another aspect of tap dancing is improvisation. Tap dancing can either be done with music following the beats provided, or without musical accompaniment; the latter is known as "a cappella" tap dancing.

Hoofers are tap dancers who dance primarily "closer to the floor", using mostly footwork and not showing very much arm or body movement. This kind of tap dancing, also called rhythm tap, was employed by slaves in America.

Steve Condos developed an innovative rhythmic tap style that influenced the work of later tap dancers such as Gregory Hines and Savion Glover. The majority of early hoofers, such as Sammy Davis Jr., Glover, Hines, and LaVaughn Robinson were African American men. Savion Glover helped bring tap dance into mainstream media by choreographing Happy Feet, a film about a tap dancing penguin. Another well-known tap film is 1989's Tap, starring Gregory Hines and many old-time hoofers.

Early tappers like Fred Astaire provided a more ballroom look to tap dancing, while Gene Kelly introduced ballet elements and style into tap. This style of tap led to what is today known as Broadway style, which is popular in American culture. It often involves high heeled tap shoes and show music, and is usually the type of tap first taught to beginners. Examples of this style are found in Broadway musicals such as Anything Goes and 42nd Street.

Common tap steps include the shuffle, shuffle ball change, double shuffle, leap shuffle, hop shuffle, flap, flap ball change, running flaps, flap heel, cramproll, buffalo, Maxi Ford, Maxi Ford with a pullback, pullbacks, wings, Cincinnati, the shim sham shimmy (also called the Lindy), Irish, Waltz Clog, the paddle roll, the paradiddle, stomp, brushes, scuffs, spanks, riffs, and single and double toe punches, hot steps, heel clicks, time steps, over-the-tops, military time step, New Yorkers, Shiggy Bops, drawbacks, and chugs. In advanced tap dancing, basic steps are often combined together to create new steps. Many steps also have single, double, and triple versions, including pullbacks, timesteps, and drawbacks. In tap, various types of turns can be done, including step heel turns, Maxi Ford turns, cramproll turns, and drag turns. Timesteps are widely used in tap and can vary in different areas. These consist of a rhythm that is changed to make new timesteps by adding or removing steps.

Tap dancing can also be done using an a cappella method, in which no musical accompaniment is provided and dancers create their own "music" through the sounds of their taps.

In group tap dances, the steps are typically kept simple and easy to control. The group of dancers must keep their steps at the correct speed to be in sync.

"Soft-Shoe" is a rhythm form of tap dancing that does not require special shoes, and though rhythm is generated by tapping of the feet, it also uses sliding of the feet (even sometimes using scattered sand on the stage to enhance the sound of sliding feet) more often than modern rhythm tap. It preceded what is currently considered to be modern tap, but has since declined in popularity.

Tap shoes

In the earliest years of tap dancing, tap shoes often had wooden soles, but most tap shoes since have had leather soles. There are a variety of styles of shoe, the Oxford shoe being very common in jazz dance, and Mary Jane (shoe) is common for younger girls in tap classes.

Tap shoe makers include Bloch and Capezio.

Taps

Depending on manufacturer and model, tap characteristics can vary considerably. For example, some taps have relatively low weight and small footprint whereas others may be thicker and fill out the edge of the shoe more, making them heavier as a result. A tap's "tone" is influenced by its weight as well as its surface shape, which may be concave or convex. The tonal quality of a tap can also be influenced by the material it is made from, and the presence of a soundboard.

Taps are mounted to the sole of the shoe with screws, and sometimes adhesive as well. The screws are driven into a soundboard – a thin fiberboard integrated into the sole that can be firmly "gripped" by the screws – to reliably attach the tap to the shoe. When no adhesive is used, the screws can be loosened or tightened to produce different sounds, whereas tonal quality is fixed when adhesive is used.

See also
Step dance
Stepping (African-American)

References

Further reading

External links 

 The Origin of Tap Dance at beholders.org
 All About Tap Dance at TheatreDance
 
 Interview with Donald O'Connor on the history of tap dancing
 Archival footage of Dianne Walker, Derick K. Grant, and Constance Vallis Hill in PillowTalks: Tap Dancing in America at Jacob's Pillow, 7/1/2010
 Tap dance dictionary
 "The Black History of Tap Dancing"—Afropop Worldwide, 1 December 2022

 
African-American dance
Jazz dance
Articles containing video clips